Chalybion is a genus of blue mud dauber wasps in the family Sphecidae. Chalybion species nest in a wide range of natural and artificial cavities such as holes in wood, walls, plant stems, etc., where they typically provision their brood cells with paralyzed spiders. They also reuse old nests of other wasps like Trypoxylon and Sceliphron.

Species
There are 49 described species of Chalybion:
 Chalybion accline (Kohl, 1918)
 Chalybion ammophiloides Hensen, 1988
 Chalybion bengalense (Dahlbom, 1845) (Hawaii, Mauritius, Mozambique, Seychelles, Socotra, South Africa; introduced in Italy)
 Chalybion bocandei (Spinola, 1851)
 Chalybion bocandei bocandei (Spinola, 1851) (Ghana, Guinea, Liberia, Sierre Leone)
 Chalybion bocandei aeronitens Hensen, 1988 (Central African Republic, Democratic Republic of Congo)
 Chalybion bonneti Leclercq, 1966 (Madagascar)
 Chalybion californicum (de Saussure, 1867) – blue mud dauber (North America; introduced in Croatia)
 Chalybion clypeatum (Fairmaire, 1858) (Angola, Cameroon, Ethiopia, Gabon, Mozambique, Tanzania, Democratic Republic of Congo)
 Chalybion clypeatum clypeatum (Fairmaire, 1858)
 Chalybion clypeatum lusingi (Leclercq, 1955) (Democratic Republic of Congo)
 Chalybion clypeatum kiloensis (Leclercq, 1955) (Democratic Republic of Congo)
 Chalybion dolichothorax (Kohl, 1918)
 Chalybion fabricator (F. Smith, 1860)
 Chalybion femoratum (Fabricius, 1781)
 Chalybion flebile (Lepeletier de Saint Fargeau, 1845)
 Chalybion frontale (Kohl, 1906)
 Chalybion fuscum (Lepeletier, 1845) (Madagascar, Sri Lanka)
 Chalybion gracile Hensen, 1988
 Chalybion gredleri (Kohl, 1918) (Democratic Republic of Congo)
 Chalybion hainanense Terayama and Tano, 2018
 Chalybion heinii (Kohl, 1906)
 Chalybion incisum Hensen, 1988
 Chalybion japonicum (Gribodo, 1880) (China, Japan, Ryukyu Islands, South Korea, Tanzania, Thailand)
 Chalybion kenyae Hensen, 1988 (Kenya)
 Clalybion klapperichi (Balthasar, 1957)
 Chalybion laevigatum (Kohl, 1888) (Botswana, Ethiopia, Mozambique, Namibia, South Africa, Tanzania, Zanzibar)
 Chalybion lividum Hensen, 1988
 Chalybion madecassum (Gribodo, 1883) (Madagascar, Seychelles Islands)
 Chalybion magnum Hensen, 1988
 Chalybion malignum (Kohl, 1906)
 Chalybion minos (de Beaumont, 1965)
 Chalybion mochii Hensen, 1988 (Kenya)
 Chalybion ohli Dollfuss, 2016
 Chalybion omissum (Kohl, 1889)
 Chalybion parvulum Hensen, 1988 (Kenya)
 Chalybion petroleum Hensen, 1988
 Chalybion planatum (Arnold, 1951) (Ethiopia)
 Chalybion polyphemus Hensen, 1988
 Chalybion ruficorne Hensen, 1988 (Central African Republic)
 Chalybion schulthessirechbergi (Kohl, 1918) (Democratic Republic of Congo)
 Chalybion sommereni (R.Turner, 1920) (Angola, Kenya, Tanzania, Democratic Republic of Congo)
 Chalybion spinolae (Lepeletier de Saint Fargeau, 1845)
Chalybion spinolae spinolae (Lepeletier, 1845) (Ethiopia, South Africa, Tanzania, Democratic Republic of Congo)
 Chalybion spinolae rufopictum Magretti, 1884 (Eritrea, Ethiopia, Mali)
 Chalybion spinolae saussurei (Kohl, 1918) (South Africa)
 Chalybion sulawesii Ohl and Höhn, 2011 
 Chalybion sumatranum (Kohl, 1884)
 Chalybion tanvinhense Pham, Ohl, and Truong, 2019 g
 Chalybion tibiale (Fabricius, 1781) (South Africa)
 Chalybion tomentosum Hensen, 1988
 Chalybion triangulum Hensen, 1988 (Central African Republic, Gambia, Togo)
 Chalybion turanicum (Gussakovskij, 1935)
 Chalybion vechti Hensen, 1988
 Chalybion walteri (Kohl, 1889)
 Chalybion yangi Li, 1995
 Chalybion zimmermanni Dahlbom, 1843 (North America)

Data source: g = GBIF,

References

Sphecidae
Taxa named by Anders Gustaf Dahlbom